Keith Barker (12 July 1936 – 30 March 2008) was a Guyanese cricketer. He played in two first-class matches for British Guiana in 1960/61 and 1963/64. His son, also named Keith Barker, plays county cricket in England, where he has additionally been a professional footballer.

See also
 List of Guyanese representative cricketers

References

External links
 

1936 births
2008 deaths
Guyanese cricketers
Guyana cricketers
People from Saint Philip, Barbados